Panneerselvam is a common name in India.

Panneerselvam
O. Panneerselvam, former Chief Minister And Deputy Chief Minister Of Tamil Nadu
M. R. K. Panneerselvam, Kurinjipadi MLA
M. Panneerselvam, former Ambur MLA
M. Panneerselvam, incumbent Sirkazhi MLA
A. T. Pannirselvam, Indian politician

Pannir Selvam
 Pannir Selvam Pranthaman, Malaysian drug trafficker sentenced to death in Singapore
 Sir A T Pannir Selvam, Indian politician